Pansy Tsang Sau Ching (born June 23, 1966) is a Cantonese Chinese voice actress in Hong Kong who is affiliated with Television Broadcasts Limited.

Career 
Tsang joined Asia Television in 1988. After the voice actor section at ATV was dismissed, she became a freelance voice actress for a short period. In 2001, she joined TVB. In January 2013, she joined Hong Kong Television Network, then returned to TVB in March 2015.

Tsang's nickname is Azuki (豆豆) because she played the part for Azuki in the anime Azuki-chan. This anime has been broadcast for a long time and her performance fit the character well.

Tsang generally acts as a younger person, teenage girls, young women and sometimes little boys. On September 9, 2002, her fans established an unofficial newsgroup for her, in which the idol would come to leave messages.

Filmography

Anime roles
Leading roles in bold
 Akazukin Chacha - Shiine
 Azuki-chan - Azuki
 Boys Over Flowers - Shizuka Todo, Tsubaki Domyoji
 Comic Party - Chisa Tsukamoto
 Corrector Yui - Yui Kasuga
 Digimon Adventure 02 - Hida Iori
 Digimon Tamers - Rika Nonaka
 Fullmetal Alchemist - Lust
 Happy Lesson - Minazuki Rokumatsuri
 Hoshin Engi - Dakki
 Jang Geum's Dream - Lee Yeon-saeng
 Kaleido Star - Sora Naegino
 Kamikaze Kaito Jeanne - Maron Kusakabe
 Kimagure Orange Road - Manami Kasuga
 Kodocha - Babbit
 Little Snow Fairy Sugar - Greta
 Mobile Suit Gundam SEED / Mobile Suit Gundam SEED Destiny - Cagalli Yula Athha
 Monster - Nina Fortner / Anna Liebert
 Nanaka 6/17 - Nanaka Kirisato
 Naruto - Temari
 Neon Genesis Evangelion - Rei Ayanami (ATV version)
 Neon Genesis Evangelion - Asuka Langley Soryu (VCD version)
 Ojamajo Doremi - Momoko Asuka, The Queen of the Witch's Land (Yuki-sensei), Nishizawa-sensei
 Petite Princess Yucie - Queen Ercell
 Pita-Ten - Hiroshi Mitarai
 Prétear - Mayune Awayuki, Shin
 Ranma ½ - Nabiki Tendo
 RG Veda - Gandharva
 Rurouni Kenshin - Makimachi Misao
 Seven of Seven - Black Nana (Jamanana)
 Slam Dunk - Akagi Haruko
 Sonic X - Amy Rose
 Sgt. Frog - Koyuki Azumaya
 The Return of the Condor Heroes - Gongsun Lü'e
 Tsubasa: Reservoir Chronicle - Tomoyo Daidouji
 UFO Baby - Miyu Kōzuki
 Uninhabited Planet Survive! - Minori
 Yakitate!! Japan - Tsukino Azusagawa
 You're Under Arrest (Season 2) - Saori Saga
 Zatch Bell! - Suzume Mizuno and Ponygon
Fresh Pretty Cure－Love Momozono

Film 
 Daredevil - Elektra Natchios played by Jennifer Garner
 Gangs of New York - Jenny Everdeane played by Cameron Diaz
 Shrek and Shrek 2 - Princess Fiona
 Vertical Limit - Annie Garrett played by Robin Tunney

Drama (American) 
 Alias - Sydney Bristow played by Jennifer Garner
 Doctor Zhivago - Larissa Feodorovna played by Keira Knightley
 Heroes - Claire Bennet played by Hayden Panettiere
 Shark - Madeline Poe played by Sarah Carter
 The O.C. - Summer Roberts played by Rachel Bilson
 Ugly Betty - Hilda Suarez played by Ana Ortiz

Drama (Japanese) 
 1 Litre of Tears (TV Series) - Aya Ikeuchi played by Erika Sawajiri
 Crying Out Love, In the Center of the World - Aki Hirose played by Haruka Ayase
 Densha Otoko (TV Series) - Tsuyoshi Yamada (Ms. Hermes) played by Atsushi Itō
 News no Onna (Anchor woman) - Aso Tamaki played by Suzuki Honami
 Galileo - Kaoru Utsumi played by Kou Shibasaki

Drama (Taiwanese) 
 Hanazakarino Kimitachihe - Chi Jun Li played by Vivienne Lee
 Meteor Garden - Tengtang Jing played by Winnie Qian
 My Fair Princess - Xia Ziwei played by Ruby Lin
 Silence - Zhao Shen Shen played by Park Eun-hye

Drama (Korean) 
 Dae Jang Geum - Lee Yeon-saeng played by Park Eun-hye, Jang-deok played by Kim Yeo-jin
 Delightful Girl Choon-Hyang - Seong Chun-hyang played by Han Chae-young
 Full House - Kang Hye-won played by Han Eun-jung
 Stairway to Heaven - Han Yoo-ri played by Kim Tae-hee
 Successful Story of a Bright Girl - Yoon Na-hee played by Han Eun-jung

Personal life 
Tsang's husband is Wong Chi Ming, a voice actor in Hong Kong.

References

List of Pansy Tsang's works (Chinese)
 清秀豆豆谷 (Chinese)

Hong Kong voice actresses
1966 births
Living people